1997 L.League Cup Final was the second final of the L.League Cup competition. The final was played at Nihondaira Sports Stadium in Shizuoka on May 11, 1997. Prima Ham FC Kunoichi won the championship.

Overview
Prima Ham FC Kunoichi won their 1st title, by defeating defending champion Yomiuri-Seiyu Beleza 3–0.

Match details

See also
1997 L.League Cup

References

Nadeshiko League Cup
1997 in Japanese women's football